Olympic National Forest is a U.S. National Forest located in Washington, USA. Olympic National Forest contains parts of Clallam, Grays Harbor, Jefferson, and Mason counties. The landscape of the national forest varies, from the temperate Olympic rain forest to the salt water fjord of Hood Canal to the peaks of Mt. Washington.

Olympic National Forest was originally created as Olympic Forest Reserve in 1897, then renamed to Olympic National Forest in 1907.  A portion of the National Forest became the Mount Olympus National Monument in 1909, which was later designated Olympic National Park.

It is administered in two ranger districts: the Pacific Ranger District on the west side of the Olympic Peninsula, and the Hood Canal Ranger District on the east side.

Forest headquarters are located in Olympia, with ranger district offices in Forks, Quinault, and Quilcene.  The former office in Hoodsport closed in 2005, and now houses a local Chamber of Commerce, which still sells Northwest Forest Passes.

Other Washington towns near entrances of the forest include Port Angeles, Sequim, and Amanda Park.

Points of interest 

 Lake Cushman
 Quinault Rain Forest
 Wynoochee Dam
 Lake Crescent

Wilderness areas 
 The Brothers Wilderness
 Buckhorn Wilderness
 Colonel Bob Wilderness
 Mt. Skokomish Wilderness
 Wonder Mountain Wilderness

Wild Olympics 

The Wild Olympics campaign is an effort to designate additional areas on the Olympic Peninsula as protected.

Under a bill introduced by United States Senator Patty Murray in January 2014 logging on an additional 126,554 acres (20%) of the Olympic National Forest's lands would be disallowed under the creation of nine new wilderness areas and expansion of the five existing ones. Wild and Scenic River designations would extend to 19 rivers, including those originating in the Olympic National Park, such as the Quinault, Hoh, Elwha, and Hamma Hamma, and some that do not, like the Middle Fork of the Satsop River. According to The Oregonian, "the wilderness designation would permanently protect old growth and ancient forest habitat throughout the region. The wild and scenic rivers designation would add federal recognition to the outstanding river systems on the peninsula, protecting them as a source of clean drinking water and helping to keep Puget Sound clean for generations. This designation does not restrict private property rights."

Like the Northern Spotted Owl controversy two decades earlier, the action has met opposition from some residents on and near the Olympic Peninsula who see it as a threat to their livelihoods. Handmade "Stop Wild Olympics" signs can be seen in the Aberdeen area and on the peninsula, expressing displeasure, and an opposition group, Working Wild Olympics, was set up in 2011. The effort has the support of dozens of "major hunting and fishing organizations" who see it as a way to sustain elk, salmon and other fish. Debate on the topic in 2014 has included community meetings drawing hundreds of individuals on both sides, and full-page advertisements in local newspapers.

An episode of This American Land concerning the Wild Olympics proposal showed nationally on PBS in 2014.

The Wild Olympics Wilderness and Wild and Scenic Rivers Act was reintroduced in 2019 as H.R.2642 and received a hearing in the House Natural Resources Subcommittee on National Parks, Forests, and Public Lands.

References

External links 

 Official web site

 
National Forests of Washington (state)
Protected areas of Clallam County, Washington
Protected areas of Grays Harbor County, Washington
Protected areas of Jefferson County, Washington
Protected areas of Mason County, Washington
Protected areas established in 1897
1897 establishments in Washington (state)